Titi Lamositele (born February 11, 1995) is an American rugby union player who plays at prop for Montpellier and the United States national team.

Club career
Lamositele made his professional debut on March 22, 2015, playing 9 minutes off the bench for Saracens in an LV= Cup loss to Exeter Chiefs. He helped Saracens win the European Champions Cup in 2017 and 2019, featuring in both finals.

On 20 February 2020, Lamositele signed for French giants Montpellier in the Top 14 ahead of the 2020–21 season.

International career
Lamositele debuted for the U.S. in 2013. Lamositele scored his first try for the United States in the 2015 Pacific Nations Cup against Samoa. Lamositele played for the U.S. at the 2015 and 2019 Rugby World Cups.

References

External links
 USA Rugby Profile

Saracens F.C. players
American rugby union players
United States international rugby union players
Living people
1995 births
Sportspeople from Tacoma, Washington
Rugby union props